Axel Laurent Angel Lambert Witsel (born 12 January 1989) is a Belgian professional footballer who plays as a defensive midfielder for La Liga club Atlético Madrid and the Belgium national team. Witsel broke into Belgium's first team as a right-winger, and can also play attacking midfielder, though his natural position is as a central midfielder.

He began his career at hometown club Standard Liège, making 183 appearances and scoring 42 goals while winning five domestic trophies. He was awarded the Belgian Golden Shoe in 2008. After a season in Portugal with Benfica, he signed for Zenit Saint Petersburg for a €40 million fee in 2012. Witsel won four honours during his time in Russia, before leaving for Tianjin Quanjian in January 2017. He returned to Europe with Borussia Dortmund in August 2018. With the Bundesliga side, Witsel won the 2019 DFL-Supercup and the 2020–21 DFB-Pokal. 

Witsel made his senior international debut in 2008 and earned his 100th cap for Belgium on 15 November 2018. He represented the country at the FIFA World Cup in 2014, 2018 and 2022, and the UEFA European Championship in 2016 and 2020, helping them to third place in the 2018 tournament.

Club career

Standard Liège
On 17 September 2006, a 17-year-old Witsel made his debut with Standard Liège during a competitive game against FC Brussels when he replaced Steven Defour in the 89th minute. Eleven days later, he made his European debut as a substitute.

During the 2007–08 season, at 18 years of age, he was a key member in the squad of Standard Liège, winners of the Belgian League title that year. During this year, he formed a very young midfield together with other Belgian talents Defour and Marouane Fellaini. In the following season, he scored the winning goal from the penalty spot in a two-legged playoff to decide the championship.

On 30 August 2009, Witsel sparked controversy when he broke Marcin Wasilewski's leg by stamping on his ankle during the match between Anderlecht and Standard. Following the tackle, Witsel protested the red card, claiming that it was an accident without intent, before being sent off the pitch. He soon apologised, but was the subject of criticism from several media outlets and numerous death threats from angry Anderlecht and Poland fans. The initial ban until 23 November by the Belgian Football Association, was later reduced on appeal to eight matches.

Benfica
Witsel signed for Portuguese club Benfica on a five-year deal on 13 July 2011, including a €40 million buyout clause. Witsel scored twice in the 3–1 win against FC Twente, in the Champions League play-off second leg, on 24 August 2011, sending Benfica to the group stages with a 5–3 aggregate victory.

He scored the opening goal in a 4–1 thrashing of Vitória de Guimarães in the Taça da Liga on 9 January 2012. He then assisted Nolito in a 4–1 league defeat of Vitória de Setúbal. Witsel scored his fourth goal against Santa Clara on 18 January in a Taça da Liga match. Benfica reached the final on 14 April against Gil Vicente and Witsel was awarded the Man of the Match award as Benfica claimed their fourth Taça da Liga title with a 2–1 victory.

Zenit Saint Petersburg
On 3 September 2012, Witsel signed for Zenit Saint Petersburg for €40 million, after signing a five-year contract. Witsel made his debut in the Russian Premier League on 14 September, replacing Konstantin Zyryanov in the 70th minute as Zenit fell 2–0 to Terek Grozny. He scored his first two goals for the club on 30 November when Zenit brushed aside Spartak Moscow 4–2 at the Luzhniki Stadium. Witsel scored Zenit's winner against Terek Grozny on 30 March 2013, an eighth-minute strike, as his side cruised to a 3–0 league victory.

In Zenit's first match of the 2014–15 UEFA Champions League group stage on 16 September 2014, Witsel scored Zenit's second goal in a 2–0 away victory over former club Benfica. After finishing third in their Champions League group, Zenit were parachuted into the Europa League knockout phase; in the first leg of their Round of 16 clash against Torino on 12 March 2015, Witsel scored on a rebound as Zenit defeated the Italian club 2–0. On 26 April, Witsel scored the game's only goal in the seventeenth minute as Zenit defeated Arsenal Tula in a league match at the Petrovsky Stadium. On Sunday 17 May, Witsel played the full 90 minutes as Zenit drew 1–1 with FC Ufa, earning the point they needed to secure the Premier League crown, the club's fourth overall and Witsel's first with Zenit.

In the 2015 Russian Super Cup on 12 July 2015, Witsel converted his penalty shot in a 4–2 penalty shoot-out victory over FC Lokomotiv Moscow after the match had finished 1–1.

Tianjin Quanjian
On 3 January 2017, Zenit officially announced that Witsel has moved to Chinese club Tianjin Quanjian.

On 4 March 2017, Witsel made his debut for Quanjian in a 2–0 loss to Guangzhou R&F. A week later he scored the club's first ever goal in the Chinese Super League during a 1–1 draw with Shanghai Greenland Shenhua.

Borussia Dortmund

On 6 August 2018, Witsel signed for Bundesliga club Borussia Dortmund and agreed a four-year contract which would last until 30 June 2022. On 21 August, he scored an equalizing goal in the stoppage time to make it 1–1 after coming on as a substitute on his debut for the club against SpVgg Greuther Fürth in the DFB-Pokal first round match and later his side went on to win the match in the extra time with a 2-1 victory. Witsel scored his first Bundesliga goal on his league debut for the club with an overhead kick in a 4–1 victory over RB Leipzig on 26 August.

Atletico Madrid 
On 7 July 2022, Atlético Madrid officially announced that Witsel had signed for the club on a one year contract via a free transfer after his contract with Borussia Dortmund expired. Under manager Diego Simeone, Witsel began to play as a defender in the middle of a back three in the 5–3–2 formation.

International career
Prior to making his international debut for the senior side, he played for the under-21 side in 2007 earning nine caps as well as helping his side reach the semi-finals of the 2007 UEFA European Under-21 Football Championship.

On 26 March 2008, Witsel made his international debut during a friendly game against Morocco. The match resulted in a 1–4 loss, but Witsel scored his first goal for Belgium.

Witsel's first goal in a competitive international match came a day short of three years after the Morocco goal, in the sixth minute against Austria in Group A of the UEFA Euro 2012 qualifying process, and his second would come in the second half. However, Belgian hopes of qualifying for UEFA Euro 2012 were dashed on 11 October 2011, by defeat to Germany coupled with Turkey's victory over Azerbaijan.

On 13 May 2014, Witsel was named in Belgium's squad for the 2014 FIFA World Cup. He started in midfield in the team's first game of the tournament, a 2–1 win against Algeria in Belo Horizonte.

Witsel also featured in the Belgian squad at UEFA Euro 2016, announced on 31 May 2016. He scored his first tournament goal during the Championships, in a Group E match against the Republic of Ireland.

He scored twice in 2018 FIFA World Cup qualification, both in wide victories over Gibraltar. Manager Roberto Martínez named him in the squad for the final tournament in Russia. Witsel was part of the Belgian squad for the 2022 World Cup in Qatar, where the team performed badly, failing to make it out of the group stages. On March 17 2023, new Belgian coach Domenico Tedesco dropped Witsel from the squad for European Championship qualifying games, citing the player's lack of playing time.

Personal life
Witsel has three children. He is of Martiniquais descent through his father. He was a boyhood Arsenal fan.

Career statistics

Club

International

As of match played 8 June 2022. Belgium score listed first, score column indicates score after each Witsel goal.

Honours
Standard Liège
 Belgian Pro League: 2007–08, 2008–09
 Belgian Cup: 2010–11
 Belgian Supercup: 2008, 2009

Benfica
 Taça da Liga: 2011–12

Zenit
 Russian Football Premier League: 2014–15
 Russian Cup: 2015–16
 Russian Super Cup: 2015

Borussia Dortmund
 DFB-Pokal: 2020–21
 DFL-Supercup: 2019
Belgium
FIFA World Cup third place: 2018
Individual
 Belgian Young Footballer of the Year: 2007–08
 Belgian Golden Shoe: 2008
 O Jogo Team of the Year: 2012

See also

List of men's footballers with 100 or more international caps

References

External links

Profile at the Atlético Madrid website

Axel Witsel goals highlights

1989 births
Living people
Belgian people of Martiniquais descent
Footballers from Liège
Black Belgian sportspeople
Belgian footballers
Association football midfielders
Standard Liège players
S.L. Benfica footballers
FC Zenit Saint Petersburg players
Tianjin Tianhai F.C. players
Atlético Madrid footballers
Borussia Dortmund players
Belgian Pro League players
Primeira Liga players
Russian Premier League players
Chinese Super League players
Bundesliga players
La Liga players
Belgium youth international footballers
Belgium under-21 international footballers
Belgium international footballers
2014 FIFA World Cup players
UEFA Euro 2016 players
2018 FIFA World Cup players
UEFA Euro 2020 players
2022 FIFA World Cup players
FIFA Century Club
Belgian expatriate footballers
Belgian expatriate sportspeople in Portugal
Belgian expatriate sportspeople in Russia
Belgian expatriate sportspeople in China
Belgian expatriate sportspeople in Germany
Expatriate footballers in Portugal
Expatriate footballers in Russia
Expatriate footballers in China
Expatriate footballers in Germany